The 2010 Dissolution Honours List was issued on 28 May 2010 at the advice of the outgoing Prime Minister, Gordon Brown. The list was gazetted on 15 June.

Life Peerages
Conservative
 Timothy Eric Boswell - former Whip and Parliamentary secretary at the Ministry of Agriculture, Fisheries and Food.
 Angela Frances Browning - former Parliamentary Secretary at the Ministry of Agriculture, Fisheries and Food.
 Rt Hon. John Selwyn Gummer - former Minister for Agriculture, Fisheries and Food, and held other senior posts in government and opposition.
 Rt Hon. Michael Howard  - former Home Secretary, Leader of the Conservative Party, and held other senior posts in government and opposition.
 John Craddock Maples - former Economic Secretary, and held other senior posts in government and opposition.
 Sir Michael Spicer - former Government Minister for Housing and Chairman of Parliamentary and Scientific Committee.

Labour
 Rt Hon. Hilary Jane Armstrong - former Chancellor of the Duchy of Lancaster and Minister for Social Exclusion, and held other senior posts in government.
 Rt Hon. Desmond (Des) Henry Browne - former Secretary of State for Defence and held other senior posts in government.
 Rt Hon. Quentin Davies - former Government Minister, Defence.
 Rt Hon. Beverley Hughes - former Minister of State, Children, Schools and Families.
 Rt Hon. John Hutton - former Secretary of State for Business, and held other senior posts in government.
 Rt Hon. James (Jim) Philip Knight, Former Minister of State.
 Rt Hon. Tommy McAvoy - former Government Deputy Chief Whip.
 Rt Hon. John McFall - former Chair of Treasury Select Committee and MP for West Dunbartonshire.
 Rt Hon. John Leslie Prescott - former Deputy Prime Minister and First Secretary of State, and held other senior posts in government.
 Rt Hon. Dr John Reid - former Home Secretary, and held other senior posts in government.
 Rt Hon. Angela Evans Smith (of Basildon) - former Minister of State, Cabinet Office.
 Rt Hon. James Donnelly (Don) Touhig - former Parliamentary under Secretary of State (Minister for Veterans), Ministry of Defence.
 Rt Hon. Michael David Wills - former Minister of State, Ministry of Justice.

Liberal Democrats
 Richard Allan - former MP for Sheffield Hallam and Chair of the Information Select Committee.
 Matthew Owen John Taylor - former MP for Truro and St Austell, Chair of National Housing Federation.
 George Philip (Phil) Willis - former MP for Harrogate and Knaresborough, Former Chair of Science and Technology Select Committee.

Democratic Unionist Party
 Rt Hon. Ian R K Paisley - former First Minister and DUP Leader.

Crossbench
 Sir Ian Blair - former Commissioner of the Metropolitan Police.

Working Peers
Conservative
 Guy Vaughan Black - former Director of Press Complaints Commission and Executive Director of Telegraph Media Group.
 Dame Margaret Eaton  - Chairman of Local Government Association.
 Edward Peter Lawless Faulks  - barrister, leading practitioner, crime and personal injuries practice.
 John Gardiner - Deputy Chief Executive of Countryside Alliance.
 Helen Margaret Newlove - campaigner against anti-social behaviour.
 Doral Amarshi Popat - businessman, Chief Executive of TLC Group, specialising  in healthcare and hospitality.
 Shireen Olive Ritchie - Local Government Councillor, specialises in areas of adult and children's social care.
 Deborah Stedman-Scott  - Chief Executive of Tomorrow's People, national employment charity working in deprived areas of UK.
 Nat Wei - a member of Teach First's founding team and also a founder of Future Leaders.
 Hon Simon Adam Wolfson - Chief Executive of NEXT plc.

Labour
 Sir Jeremy Hugh Beecham  - senior figure in English local government and first Chairman of the Local Government Association.
 Rt Hon. Paul Boateng - former Government Minister and MP for Brent South.
 Rita Margaret Donaghy  - former Chair Conciliation and Arbitration Service.
 Jeannie Drake - former Deputy General Secretary of the Communication Workers Union.
 Dr Dianne Hayter - Chair of Legal Services Consumer Panel.
 Anna Healy - former Government and political adviser, serving in numerous government departments.
 Roy Kennedy - Labour Party's Director of Finance and Compliance, long serving member of the Labour Party.
 Rt Hon. Helen Liddell - former Secretary State of Scotland.
 Roger John Liddle - former Special Adviser on Europe.
 Rt Hon. Dr Jack Wilson McConnell - former First Minister of Scotland.
 John Monks - General Secretary, European Trades Union Confederation.
 Sue Nye - former Director of Government Relations, Prime Minister's Office.
 Maeve Sherlock  - former Chief Executive of the Refugee Council and Former Special Advisor to Chancellor.
 Robert Wilfrid (Wilf) Stevenson - former Director of the Smith Institute and Special Adviser to the PM.
 Margaret Wheeler  - Director of Organisation and Staff Development for the public service union UNISON.
 Michael Williams - former Special Adviser on Foreign Affairs.

Liberal Democrats
 Floella Benjamin  - actor, presenter and campaigner for children's issues.
 Mike German  - former Deputy First Minister (Wales).
 Meral Hussein Ece  - Local Government Councillor in Islington, advocate of equality issues.
 Sir Kenneth (Ken) Macdonald  - former Director of Public Prosecutions.
 Kathryn (Kate) Jane Parminter - former Chief Executive of Campaign to Protect Rural England.
 John Shipley  - leading Local Government Councillor in Newcastle upon Tyne.

Knights Bachelor
 William (Bill) O’Brien - former MP for Normanton 1983-2005.
 Rt Hon. Ian McCartney - former Minister of State, FCO and DTI and held other senior posts in government.

Privy Council
 Dominic Grieve  - Attorney-General.
 Greg Clark  - Minister of State, Department of Communities and Local Government.
 Alan Duncan  - Minister of State, Department for International Development.
 Chris Grayling  - Minister of State, Department of Work and Pensions.
 Nick Herbert  - Minister of State, Ministry of Justice and the Home Office.
 Baroness Neville-Jones of Hutton Roof  - Minister of State, Home Office.
 Grant Shapps  - Minister of State, Department of Communities and Local Government.
 Theresa Villiers  - Minister of State, Department for Transport.
 David Willetts  - Minister of State, Department for Business, Innovation and Skills.
 David Mundell  - Parliamentary Under Secretary of State, Scotland Office.
 John Randall  - Deputy Chief Whip (Treasurer of Her Majesty's Household).
 Mark Francois  - Government Whip (Vice Chamberlain of Her Majesty's Household).
 Nigel Dodds 
 Joan Ruddock 
 Lord West of Spithead 
 Carwyn Jones  - First Minister for Wales.
 Alex Fergusson

Rejections 
Outgoing Labour MP Keith Hill claimed he was offered a knighthood but declined it, saying he would find the title "embarrassing".

References

External links
 Downing Street announcement of the list

Dissolution Honours
Dissolution Honours 2010
Gordon Brown
2010 awards in the United Kingdom